Henry West may refer to:

Henry Skinner West (1870–1961), principal of Maryland State Normal School, now Towson University
Henry Wyndham West (1823–1893), English barrister and Liberal politician
Henry F. West (1796–1856), mayor of Indianapolis, Indiana
Henry West (MP for Bedford), MP for Bedford
Henry Litchfield West (1859–1940), journalist and Commissioner of the District of Columbia
Harry West (1917–2004), politician in Northern Ireland

See also